Leon Jay Williams (born 30 July 1976), also known as Li Wei-lian, is a Singaporean actor, singer and model who also frequently works in Taiwan and mainland China. In addition to Mandarin Chinese, he speaks English; he sometimes displays this ability in his work on television shows. He was a former model.

Acting career 
He is known for starring in several Taiwanese dramas, including Green Forest, My Home and Heaven's Wedding Gown. He has also made a cameo appearance in Smiling Pasta. His most recent drama appearance is in "Zhang Xiao Wu's Spring". Williams was also a former Mister Singapore and Mister International Man. He used to sign to ECI Global Talent Management. 

Since 2022, he signed with Mediacorp's The Celebrity Agency after relocating back to Singapore.

Personal life 
Williams is of mixed English, German, Japanese and Chinese descent: his paternal grandfather is English, while his paternal grandmother is of mixed Germans and Japanese ancestry. His mother is a Chinese Singaporean.

Williams married in 2014 to Joyce, a Taiwanese, and they have a daughter in 2015.

Discography

Albums
 Sweet Inspirations: Leon Jay Williams - 2005
 Leon has released his first album – ‘Sweet Inspirations’, compiling of English songs from the 60s and 70s. He sang one of the tracks – Can't Smile Without You, and made an MV for another track – And I Love You So.
 Green Green Forest My Home OST : Forever - 2006
 Upcoming EP with Beijing Olympic Water Cube Team Song - Love Flows (Mandarin Version) and Friends (Korea Version) duet with Han Ji Hye. Expected to be released end 2008.

Filmography
 La Robe De Mariee Des Cieux 《天国的嫁衣》 (2004)
 Green Forest, My Home 《绿光森林》 (2005)
 Fly with Me 《想飞》 (China Production) (2007)
 My Lucky Star 《放羊的星星》 (2007)
 Imperfect 《十全九美》 (China Production) (2008)
 Jump 《跳出去》 (Hong Kong Production) (2009)
 Gangster Rock (2010)
 The Love River 《藍海1加1》(2010)
 Zhang Xiaowu's Spring 《張小五的春天》(2010)
 My Sassy Girl 2 (2010)
 Death Zone (2012)
 Lemon (2013)
 Timeless Love (2013)
 Turn Around (2014)
 Who Moved My Dream (2014)
 Doomed Disaster (2015)
 For Love (2016)
 Lulu the Movie (2016)
 What a Wonderful Life 《赛小花的远大前程》 (2017)
 Ice Cream Lover 《冷恋时代》 (2018)
 The Thieves 《夺宝大师》 (2021)
 The Enticement 《诱惑》 (China Production) (2022)

References

External links

 

1976 births
Living people
Singaporean male models
21st-century Singaporean male singers
Singaporean male television actors
Singaporean male film actors
Singaporean people of Chinese descent
Singaporean people of English descent
Singaporean people of German descent
Singaporean people of Japanese descent